George Alexander Carse FRSE  RSSA (20 June 1880 – 20 August 1950) was a leading Scottish physicist and educationalist. In 1925, he was the first Mitchell Lecturer.

Life
He was born in Edinburgh on 20 June 1880, the first child of George Carse, a decorator from Duns, and his wife Jane. The family lived at 120 Lauriston Place, south-west of the city center. In 1891, he went to George Heriot’s School and was the school dux for 1898. He then won a place at the University of Edinburgh studying mathematics under Professor George Chrystal and physics under Professor Peter Tait. Carse graduated in 1903 and received a doctorate in 1908, having attended Emmanuel College, Cambridge from 1904 to 1907 (working at the Cavendish Laboratory).

In November 1904 he was elected as a Fellow of the Royal Society of Edinburgh, his main proposer being Professor George Chrystal.

During the First World War he had served in the Royal Arsenal, Woolwich.

He spent the majority of his working life lecturing in physics at the University of Edinburgh retiring in 1948. He was an office bearer in several non-academic roles in the University, mainly concerning university finances.

He served as the Vice President to the Royal Scottish Society of Arts, in 1935/36 and 1946/47, respectively.

He died in Edinburgh on 20 August 1950. His RSE obituary was written by Arthur Melville Clark.

Other positions held
Convener of Foundation Committee, University of Edinburgh
Governor, Edinburgh and East of Scotland College of Agriculture
Governor, Heriot-Watt College

Publications
Notes on Practical Physics for Junior Students (1926)

References

1880 births
1950 deaths
Scientists from Edinburgh
People educated at George Heriot's School
Fellows of the Royal Society of Edinburgh
Academics of the University of Edinburgh
Alumni of the University of Edinburgh
Scottish physicists